The Pakistan Peoples Party (Shaheed Bhutto)  (abbreviated as PPP-SB) is a political party in Pakistan and one of three breakaway factions of the old Pakistan Peoples Party. The party is currently headed by Ghinwa Bhutto, the widow of Murtaza Bhutto.

In December 2012, Ghinwa Bhutto stated that her stepdaughter Fatima Bhutto would contest in the 2013 general elections for a seat in the National Assembly on behalf of the Pakistan Peoples Party (Shaheed Bhutto). Fatima was not present on the occasion, although Fatima is known for her outspoken public stance in the past where she had several times expressed no desire to run for public office, ruling a political career out "entirely because of the effect of dynasties on Pakistan" (referring to the Bhutto family's involvement in politics that has continued through generations of the family) and nowadays it is generally accepted that the PTI has taken over the old PPP-SB cadres.

References

External links
 Official website of Pakistan Peoples Party (Shaheed Bhutto)
 Provincial website of Pakistan Peoples Party (Shaheed Bhutto)
 Profile of PPP-SB on elections.com.pk

Secularism in Pakistan
Socialist parties in Pakistan
Democratic socialist parties in Asia
Pakistan People's Party breakaway groups